Vennelakanti Rajeswara Prasad (30 November 1957 – 5 January 2021) was an Indian lyricist and writer known for his work in Telugu cinema. He wrote over 2000 film songs, and was awarded Andhra Pradesh State Nandi Award for Best Lyricist in 2000.

Career 
Vennelakanti was inclined towards Harikathas, and began writing from a young age. Initially, he worked as a banker and wrote his first film song for Krishnam Raju-starrer Sriramachandrudu.

He was also known for his works as dubbing script writer and contributing lyrics for Tamil films, dubbed into Telugu language.

Filmography
Lyricist
1988: Murali Krishnudu
1991: Aditya 369
1993: One By Two 
1994: Gharana Alludu 
1994: Theerpu
1995: Gharana Bullodu
1995: Criminal 
1996: Shri Krishnarjuna Vijayam
1999: Samarasimha Reddy 
1999: Seenu 
1999: Premãnurãgam (Dubbed Version of Hindi film Hum Saath-Saath Hain) 
2001: Bhalevadivi Basu
2001: Cheppalani Vundhi 
2002: Takkari Donga
2006: Pellaina Kothalo 
2007: Bhayya (dubbed version of Tamil film Malaikottai)
2009: Mitrudu
2010: Aawara(kaarthi)  
2011: Vastadu Naa Raju
2011: Raaj 
2020: Penguin 

Dialogue writer
Premãnurãgam (1999) (Dubbed Version of Hindi film Hum Saath-Saath Hain)
Panchathantiram (2002) (dubbed version of Tamil film of same name)
Magic Magic 3D (2003) (dubbed version of Tamil film of same name)
Prema Chadhurangam (2004) (dubbed version of Tamil film Chellame)
Monalisa (2004) (dubbed version of Kannada film of same name)
Pothuraju (2004) (dubbed version of Tamil film Virumaandi)
Mumbai Xpress (2005) (dubbed version of Tamil film of same name)
Dasavathaaram (2008) (dubbed version of Tamil film of same name)
Saroja (2008) (dubbed version of Tamil film of same name)
Manmadha Baanam (2010) (dubbed version of Tamil film Manmadhan Ambu)
Prema Khaidi (2011) (dubbed version of Tamil film Mynaa)

Personal life and death
His elder son Shashank Vennelakanti works as dialogue writer for dubbed films. His younger son, Rakendu Mouli, also started his career as a lyricist and singer for several dubbing films. His first 'direct' film was Andala Rakshasi, in which he wrote two songs and rendered his voice for one. He made his debut as a lead actor with Moodu Mukkallo Cheppalante.

He died on 5 January 2021, in Chennai after suffering from cardiac arrest.

References

External links
 
 Entry at movies.dosthana.com

1957 births
2021 deaths
Telugu-language lyricists
Indian lyricists
Nandi Award winners